Osteochilus is a genus of cyprinid fishes mainly found in Southeast Asia with a few extending into adjacent parts of China. Additionally, two species (O. longidorsalis and O. nashii) are endemic to the Western Ghats in India.

Species
There are currently 35 recognized species in this genus:

References

 
Taxa named by Albert Günther
Cyprinid fish of Asia
Cyprinidae genera